Minying International Trade Center T2 is a supertall skyscraper in Dongguan, Guangdong, China. It has a height of 423 m . Construction began in 2014 and was completed in 2021. The 96 floor tower opened on September 26, 2021, and is the fourteenth-tallest building in China and the tallest building in Dongguan

References

Skyscrapers in Guangdong
Buildings and structures in Dongguan
Buildings and structures under construction in China
Skyscraper office buildings in China